Thomas Thurston January (January 8, 1886 – January 25, 1957) was an American amateur soccer player who competed in the 1904 Summer Olympics.

In 1904 he was a member of the Christian Brothers College team, which won the silver medal in the soccer tournament. He played all four matches as a midfielder. His older brother John and younger brother Charles were also members of a silver medal winning team.

References

External links
profile

1886 births
1957 deaths
American soccer players
Footballers at the 1904 Summer Olympics
Olympic silver medalists for the United States in soccer
Medalists at the 1904 Summer Olympics
Association football midfielders
Christian Brothers Cadets men's soccer players